In mathematics, specifically the field of algebraic number theory, a Minkowski space is a Euclidean space associated with an algebraic number field.

If K is a number field of degree d then there are d distinct embeddings of K into C.   We let KC be the image of K in the product Cd, considered as equipped with the usual Hermitian inner product.  If c denotes complex conjugation, let KR denote the subspace of KC fixed by c, equipped with a scalar product.  This is the Minkowski space of K.

See also
 Geometry of numbers

Footnotes

References
 

Algebraic number theory